The 2017 Stamford mayoral election was held on November 7, 2017. The election saw the reelection of David Martin.

General election

References

2017
Stamford
Stamford